Leonardo Santos Rodrigues (born 7 January 1999 in Olhão) is a Portuguese footballer who plays for UD Melilla as a goalkeeper.

Football career
On 9 January 2016, Rodrigues made his professional debut with Olhanense in a 2015–16 Segunda Liga match against Benfica B. After appearing in eight matches with Olhanense and a brief spell in the C.S. Marítimo reserves, he signed with Segunda División B side CD Don Benito.

References

External links

Stats and profile at LPFP 

1999 births
Living people
People from Olhão
Portuguese footballers
Association football goalkeepers
Liga Portugal 2 players
S.C. Olhanense players
C.S. Marítimo players
Segunda División B players
CD Don Benito players
UD Melilla footballers
Portuguese expatriate footballers
Portuguese expatriate sportspeople in Spain
Expatriate footballers in Spain
Sportspeople from Faro District